Ijrud County is in Zanjan province, Iran. The capital of the county is the city of Zarrinabad. At the 2006 census, the county's population was 35,661 in 9,029 households. The following census in 2011 counted 38,416 people in 11,042 households. At the 2016 census, the county's population was 36,641 in 11,317 households.

Administrative divisions

The population history of Ijrud County's administrative divisions over three consecutive censuses is shown in the following table. The latest census shows two districts, four rural districts, and two cities.

References

 

Counties of Zanjan Province